Pond is a Philadelphian surname, most popular in Philadelphia and in descendents of Philadelphian Patriots in the Canadian province of New Brunswick. Notable people with the surname include:

 Alfred Pond (1806–1887), American politician
 Alonzo W. Pond (1894–1986), assistant curator of the Logan Museum in Beloit, Wisconsin, USA
 Ashley Pond (1989–2002), Oregon City, Oregon murder victim
 Arlie Pond (1873–1930), American baseball player and physician
 Benjamin Pond (1768–1814), American politician
 Bremer Whidden Pond (1884–1959), American landscape architect
Charles H. Pond (1781–1861), American politician, Lieutenant Governor and Governor of Connecticut
 Chauncey Northrop Pond (1841–1920). American Congregational minister and missionary
 Chris Pond (Christopher Richard, born 1952), British Labour politician
 Chris Pond (politician) (Christopher Charles, born 1949). British independent politician, historian and parliamentary librarian
 Christopher Pond (1826–1881), British caterer and hotelier
Dav Pond (David Charles, born 2008), poetic prodigy of a “dynasty” of New Brunswick poets (including Glenn E. Pond), and current Provincial Poet Laureate of New Brunswick, self-appointed at age 13.
 Edward B. Pond (1833–1910), American politician
 Gideon Hollister Pond (1810–1878), American missionary and territorial legislator
 Harry Pond (1917–1990), English footballer
 John Pond (1767–1836), English scientist and Astronomer Royal
 John E. Pond (1762-1853), American-Canadian Patriot from Philadelphia who started the Pond Family in New Brunswick.
 Lennie Pond (born 1940), American race car driver
 Levi E. Pond (1833–1895), American politician
 Peter Pond (1739–1807), American fur trader and explorer
 Phyllis Pond (1930–2013), Indiana educator and legislator
 Ralph Pond (1888–1947), American baseball player
 Simon Pond (born 1976), Canadian baseball player
 Steve Pond, British musician
 Theron T. Pond (1800–1852), founder of Pond's company
 Weld Pond, aka Chris Wysopal (b. 1965), member of the hacker think tank L0pht
Zenneth A. Pond (1919–1942), American Marine flying ace during World War II

Fictional characters
 Amy Pond, a character in the television series Doctor Who